Direction Lourdes is a Belgian-French road movie directed by Bo & Gustavo Catilina in 2017.

Plot 
Leopold is an old adolescent. He still lives under the mighty influence of his aging and ailing father who will die very soon. If he dies, Leopold's structured and ordered world will collapse. He has to save his father but in order to do that he needs a miracle.

For the first time in his life, Leopold takes destiny in his own two hands and makes a trip from Belgium to Lourdes with his father's fancy Rover.

At the very beginning of his trip, he stumbles on a broken down 2CV and its driver : Lola. Lola joins Leopold on an unforgettable road trip to Lourdes. One journey, many adventures, many challenges, two different characters meet : Leo, serious, fearful, crushed under dogmas, Lola, wild, spontaneous and full of trust.

References

External links
 
 

2017 films
French drama road movies
Belgian drama road movies
2010s French-language films
French-language Belgian films
2010s drama road movies
2010s French films